The first USS Calypso was a steamer captured by the Union Navy during the American Civil War.

Calypso was used by the Navy as a gunboat, and was ordered to patrol navigable waterways of the Confederacy to prevent the South from trading with other countries.

Calypso captured by Union Navy forces 

Civil War service

Assigned to the North Atlantic Blockade 
 
Calypso joined the North Atlantic Blockading Squadron off Wilmington, North Carolina, and on 24 October 1863, took her first prize off Frying Pan Shoals, the schooner Herald. Returning to Norfolk, Virginia, in November for repairs, the steamer was back on duty off Wilmington 31 March 1864.

The troops were successfully landed from Nansemond in boats from both ships on 21 June, and through the next days, Calypso's boats patrolled up the river and carried supplies to the Army. When Confederate opposition prevented the linkup of the landing party with a force moving overland, Calypso swiftly evacuated the soldiers.

Patrolling for blockade runners from the Bahama Islands 
 
Calypso was sent north with her prize 6 November, and after receiving repairs at New York City, returned late in spring 1865 to cruising from Chesapeake Bay to the coast of Florida.

Post-war decommissioning and sale 

She was decommissioned at the Washington Navy Yard 15 August 1865, and was sold at New York City 30 November 1865.

References 

Ships of the Union Navy
Steamships of the United States Navy
Gunboats of the United States Navy
American Civil War patrol vessels of the United States